Ronald Merrill Theobald (July 28, 1943 – April 14, 2016) was an American second baseman in Major League Baseball who played for the Milwaukee Brewers during the early 1970s. He was born in Oakland, California and died in Walnut Creek, California.

Early life
Theobald was born in Oakland, California and graduated from Harry Ells High School in Richmond, California in 1961.

He played college baseball at the University of Arizona

Career
He was signed as a free agent by the Chicago Cubs in 1964.

Later that year, he was drafted from the Cubs by the Minnesota Twins in the First-Year Player Draft.

In March 1970, Theobald was purchased by the Washington Senators. On May 11, 1970, he was traded, along with Hank Allen, to the Milwaukee Brewers for Wayne Comer.

Theobald made his MLB debut on April 12, 1971 with the Brewers and played for two seasons before retiring in 1973.

Theobald died in Walnut Creek, California on April 14, 2016 at the age of 72.

References

External links
, or Retrosheet, or Pura Pelota

1943 births
2016 deaths
Arizona Wildcats baseball players
Baseball players from Oakland, California
Charlotte Hornets (baseball) players
Denver Bears players
Florida Instructional League Reds players
Fort Worth Cats players
Hawaii Islanders players
Indianapolis Indians players
Major League Baseball second basemen
Milwaukee Brewers players
Sportspeople from Richmond, California
Tigres de Aragua players
American expatriate baseball players in Venezuela
University of Arizona alumni
Wenatchee Chiefs players